In mathematics, a nonabelian cohomology is any cohomology with coefficients in a nonabelian group, a sheaf of nonabelian groups or even in a topological space.

If homology is thought of as the abelianization of homotopy (cf. Hurewicz theorem), then the nonabelian cohomology may be thought of as a dual of homotopy groups.

Nonabelian Poincaré duality 

See: Nonabelian Poincare Duality (Lecture 8)

See also 
Stacks
Group cohomology

References 
 
 

Cohomology theories